Milden is a hamlet, estate and farmstead in Glenesk, Angus, Scotland.

See also
 Tarfside
 Edzell

References

Villages in Angus, Scotland

gd:Bruach Tarbha
ro:Tarfside